is a Japanese surname. Notable people with the surname include:

Aijiro Tomita (1885–1954), Japanese politician
Hiroyuki Tomita (born 1980), Japanese gymnast
Isao Tomita (1932–2016), Japanese electronic music composer
Kazuo Tomita (born 1939), Japanese swimmer who participated in the 1960 Summer Olympics in Rome
Kishti Tomita (born 1963), Swedish voice coach and television personality
, Japanese former professional baseball player
, Japanese footballer
Kōichirō Tomita (1925–2006), Japanese astronomer
Kōsei Tomita (born 1936), Japanese voice actor
Makiko Tomita (born 1991), Japanese rugby sevens player
Masaru Tomita (born 1957), Japanese molecular biologist and computer science professor, and son of Isao Tomita
, Japanese former professional baseball player
Mayu Tomita (born 1995), Japanese singer and actress
Minoru Tomita (1924–2015), Japanese mathematician and originator of Tomita-Takesaki theory in von Neumann algebras.
Naoya Tomita (born 1989), Japanese breaststroke swimmer
Nene Tomita (born 1982), Japanese volleyball player
, Japanese snowboarder
Shoichi Tomita (born 1936), Japanese Olympic ice hockey player
, Japanese idol
Tamlyn Tomita (born 1966), Japanese-born American actress
Teiko Tomita (1896–1990), Japanese poet
Tomita Tsunejirō (1865–1937), Japanese judoka, and the first ever to be awarded black belt in judo
Tsutomu Tomita (born 1943), the former chairman of Toyota Motorsport GmbH and current president of Fuji Speedway
Richard Tomita (born 1927), American Olympic weightlifter
Yoshio Tomita, Japanese table tennis world champion

See also
Tomita–Takesaki theory

Japanese-language surnames